Kiser Lake State Park is a public recreation area in Champaign County, Ohio, located  northwest of St. Paris and  north of Dayton. The  state park includes  Kiser Lake, for which it was named, and the  Kiser Lake Wetlands State Nature Preserve.

History
A dam was first built in this location in 1840 to power a mill, but it was later abandoned and the dam and lake fell into disrepair. In 1932, John W. Kiser donated the land to the State of Ohio to rebuild the lake for recreational purposes. In 1939, construction started on the new dam, and a year later the lake was filled.

Activities
Scuba diving and sailing are also popular activities since no motorized boats are allowed on the lake.

References

External links
Kiser Lake State Park Ohio Department of Natural Resources 
Kiser Lake State Park Map Ohio Department of Natural Resources

State parks of Ohio
Protected areas of Champaign County, Ohio
Protected areas established in 1940
1940 establishments in Ohio